Dr. Jack is a 1922 American silent comedy film starring Harold Lloyd. It was produced by Hal Roach and directed by Fred Newmeyer. The story was by Jean Havez, Hal Roach, and Sam Taylor. The film was released on November 26, 1922.

Grossing $1,275,423, Dr. Jack was one of the top-ten most profitable releases of 1922.

Plot
As described in a film magazine, young Dr. Jackson (Lloyd), or Dr. Jack, has plenty of practice but scant fees. He believes in using sunshine methods and avoids medicine as far as possible. This is quite contrary to the methods employed by the renowned Dr. Ludwig von Saulsbourg (Mayne), who for four years has reaped a golden harvest out of the father (Prince) of the Sick-Little-Well-Girl (Davis), keeping the latter in dark rooms and feeding her drugs without end. The family lawyer Jamison (Hammond) introduces Dr. Jack as a consultant and things begin to happen. Dr. Jack has met the Girl once accidentally, and is overjoyed when he is called to prescribe for her, a proceeding that results in both falling in love. Caught kissing the Girl, Dr. Jack falls into disgrace and is told that he must leave the next morning. In the meantime, news that a dangerous lunatic has escaped and has been seen in the vicinity of the house reaches its occupants. Dr. Jack, who holds that a little excitement is all the patient needs to make her perfectly normal, arranges a night alarm for the occupants of the home. He dons a wig and hat and, thus disguised, makes unexpected appearances in various parts of the establishment, throwing everybody into spasms of momentary terror. In the long run he reveals himself to the Girl, her father realizes that she is cured, von Saulsbourg is required to make an undignified exit, and the two lovers are happy.

Background 
Dr. Jack is an upbeat gag-driven film, played solely for laughs. Released between the sensitive, complex character comedy of Grandma's Boy and the daredevil "thrill picture" Safety Last!, it was Lloyd's first intentional five-reeler, whereas his two previous features, A Sailor-Made Man and Grandma's Boy, both grew from two-reelers to five-reelers during the actual shooting.

Cast
 Harold Lloyd as Dr. Jackson - "Jack" for short
 Mildred Davis as The Sick-Little-Well-Girl 
 John T. Prince as Her Father  
 Eric Mayne as Dr. Ludwig von Saulsbourg
 C. Norman Hammond as Jamison, the Lawyer
 Charles Stevenson as Asylum Guard

Preservation status
Prints of Dr. Jack exist in the collection of the UCLA Film and Television Archive and the British Film Institute's National Film Archive.

See also
 Harold Lloyd filmography

References

External links

 Official website (only the forum is currently online)
 
 
 
 

1922 films
American silent feature films
American black-and-white films
Films directed by Fred C. Newmeyer
Silent American comedy films
Films with screenplays by H. M. Walker
Films with screenplays by Sam Taylor (director)
1922 comedy films
1920s American films